Chinatown Nights, also known as Tong War, is a 1929 film starring Wallace Beery and begun as a silent film then finished as an all-talking sound one via dubbing. Directed by William A. Wellman and released by Paramount Pictures, Chinatown Nights also stars Florence Vidor, former wife of director King Vidor, who did not dub her own voice and quit the movie business immediately afterward, preferring not to work in sound films; her voice in Chinatown Nights was supplied by actress Nella Walker. The supporting cast includes Warner Oland as a Chinese gangster and Jack Oakie as a stuttering reporter. The movie was based upon the story "Tong War" by Samuel Ornitz.

Cast
Wallace Beery as Chuck Riley
Florence Vidor as Joan Fry (voice dubbed by Nella Walker)
Warner Oland as Boston Charley
Jack McHugh as the Shadow
Jack Oakie as the Reporter

References

External links
 
 
 Chinatown Nights at the silentera.com database

1929 films
1920s English-language films
Films directed by William A. Wellman
Transitional sound films
1929 crime drama films
American crime drama films
Films produced by David O. Selznick
American black-and-white films
Films scored by Karl Hajos
1920s American films